Mohammad Tawhidi is an Australian Shia Muslim influencer and self-proclaimed "Imam". 
He currently serves as the Vice President of The Global Imams Council, a little known organisation based in Iraq.

Early life and education
Tawhidi self-identifies as a Shia Muslim of Iraqi origin who was born in Qom, Iran, in 1982 or 1983.

In 2009, he enrolled for a bachelor's degree in Islamic studies at Al-Mustafa University in Qom, but dropped out in 2012. He later worked for one of the Shirazi-run television stations in Karbala. In 2015, he returned to Australia, and is currently based in Adelaide. He is fluent in Arabic, English, and Persian.

Views
Tawhidi had earlier held Sadiq Hussaini Shirazi as his marja taqlid. Since 2015, Tawhidi has stated that he does not subscribe to any particular religious leader.  There have been marked differences between his and Shirazi's views on a host of issues.

Tawhidi is president of the Islamic Association of South Australia, which he founded in 2016. He refers to himself as the "Imam of Peace".

Islam 
Tawhidi believes that Islam must be reformed in order to survive. He deems all acts of terrorism to be condemned in the Quran, and had denounced ISIL as an extremist body that did not represent the religion; in June 2017, after the jihadi terrorist attack in London, he described the branch as a "cancer" on the religion. He has been also critical of the treatment of women in Islamic countries, has called for the appointment of women to the Australian National Imams Council and rejected the use of hijab in public. Tawhidi also oppose Muslims justifying domestic violence, polygamy and the killing of apostates.

Political views 
He supports limiting the building of mosques, has urged for bans of Islamic texts, particularly the Sahih al-Bukhari, in that they have been used as an ideological underpinning for acts of terrorism, advocates for the deportation of radical Islamic leaders from Australia and supports a temporary travel-ban on Muslims coming from the Middle East to Australia.

Tawhidi has claimed of halal certification to threaten the Australian way of life,  and was one of the most vocal advocates for shutting down of Islamic schools in entirety, or radically reforming them, for security reasons. After making these comments, Tawhidi claimed he had been "escorted into hiding by the police" for fear of retribution by the Muslim community. However, a police spokesperson told The Australian that "there have been no incidents relating to the removal of a person from a mosque or similar place."

During August 2019, upon India revoking the special status of Jammu and Kashmir, he said of Kashmir to be a Hindu land which was rightfully claimed by India, and further argued that both Pakistan and Kashmir belonged to India, since it was older than Islam.

Imam Mohammad Tawhidi said Palestine along with Lebanon, Jordan, Egypt and Syria is Jewish land because Jews lived there before Muslims. He believes Jews have a right to form a Jewish state across all these countries.

Media attention
In March 2016, Tawhidi released a statement concerning a man who was released on bail after allegedly grabbing a woman's headscarf on a bus in Adelaide. He stated: "If government laws do not prevent such assaults, then I fear that a day will come where the Muslim community might take matters into their own hands to protect their women and mothers." His statement also said that the Australian Government should review its laws on female headscarves. Tawhidi later clarified that his statement was not meant to be interpreted as a threat, and he was unhappy with how his comments were portrayed by the ABC and Daily Mail Australia. He said that the misinterpretation by media outlets inspired him to found the "Imams for Peace" organisation.

Later in 2016, he attended the World Alliance of Religions for Peace (WARP) Summit in South Korea, hosted by Lee Man-hee. The WARP Summit coincided with the birthday of Lee Man-hee. Tawhidi was supportive of the event and was quoted as saying "this WARP Summit is an event blessed by God because it is every religious person's wish to achieve peace through an alliance into one religion."

In February 2017, Tawhidi caused controversy when he appeared on an episode of Australian current affairs program Today Tonight. During the episode, he suggested that Islamic extremists were conspiring to set up a caliphate in Australia. He also made claims that these extremists planned to increase the Muslim population in Australia and rename streets after Islamic terrorists. Tawhidi called for a government body to be established in order to investigate the Muslim community.

In the same month, Tawhidi made a request to defend former Jakarta Governor Ahok during his blasphemy trial. He argued that the aggrieved Islamic groups had incorrectly interpreted the verse of the Quran that Ahok had allegedly referenced in a blasphemous manner. Tawhidi stated that there is nothing wrong with non-Muslims leading a Muslim-majority country. Tawhidi said he has received death threats from Indonesia's Islamic Defenders Front.

Tawhidi previously had his arrival to Indonesia rejected, in October 2015, after he was considered to have insulted the Sunni-majority nation by calling it "Indoneshia". Islamic organisation Hidayatullah described Tawhidi as "an extreme Shia." A statement from DPP ABI, an Indonesian Shia organisation, said Tawhidi was suspected of being a "takfiri" and they rejected his presence in Indonesia. The statement went on to say that Tawhidi's presence would undermine efforts to "achieve unity of the Muslims in the face of Zionism."

In May 2017, Tawhidi appeared as a guest on Australian breakfast television program Sunrise to discuss the recent Manchester Arena bombing. He claimed many young Muslims were being pushed to believe killing infidels would allow them to gain paradise and that the Manchester bomber would have believed he would go to heaven for what he did.

He is also a fan of Indian actress Raveena Tandon; some of his tweets about her were compiled in a viral Twitter thread in 2019.

In 2019 he was the first Shia Imam to "pay respects at Auschwitz" concentration camp.

Reception
Bronwyn Adcock, writing for the ABC, said Tawhidi had very few supporters in the Muslim community.

Sectarianism 
Zuhdi Jasser, writing an op-ed for Asia Times Online, said that Tawhidi only criticised Sunni Islamists and never Islamists within his own community such as the Iran regime; in essence, he was not a reformist but a Shia radical. Chloe Patton, in a piece for the ABC, referred to Tawhidi as a "Shia extremist" and accused him of waging a "sectarian war against Australia's majority Sunni community." Patton referred to Tawhidi's comments to Andrew Bolt that Sahih al-Bukhari, a sacred Sunni text, should be banned. Paul Barry, presenter of Media Watch, made mention of Tawhidi's calling sacred Sunni texts "monkey teachings", and described Sunnis as "followers of an alcoholic, rapist caliph."

Far right 
Tawhidi has been embraced by a number of Western far-right and Islamophobic groups. Tawhidi has been accused of being an ally of Australian far-right groups including the Australian Liberty Alliance as well as One Nation. Tawhidi had defended One Nation leader Pauline Hanson and supported her stances.

Legal issues
On November 4, 2022, Tawhidi was ordered to pay $20,000 in aggravated damages for making defamatory claims on Twitter that a man named Moustafa Awad was an "ISIS Promoter."  Tawhidi also suggested on social media that his followers "report" Awad for being an "extremist," while publicly posting Awad's phone number, email address and business profiles online.

Notes

References

External links 

@Imamofpeace  Twitter

Year of birth uncertain
Living people
21st-century imams
Australian imams
Australian people of Iraqi descent
Australian Shia Muslims
Critics of Islamism
Critics of Sunni Islam
Iranian emigrants to Australia
Muslim reformers
Muslim supporters of Israel
Iranian people of Iraqi descent
Critics of Wahhabism
Year of birth missing (living people)